The linespotted Ufipa barb (Enteromius brachygramma) is a rare species African freshwater cyprinid fish. It is only known from a small affluent of the Lukinda in the Lake Mweru system of the Congo River basin, in D.R. Congo.

Footnotes 

 
 Barbus brachygramma IUCN Red List (accessed 2014)

Enteromius
Taxa named by George Albert Boulenger
Fish described in 1915
Cyprinid fish of Africa
Fish of the Democratic Republic of the Congo
Endemic fauna of the Democratic Republic of the Congo